= Association of Travestis of Paraíba =

Travesti organization

- Type: NGO
- Headquarters: Rua General Osório, S/N, João Pessoa, Paraíba

The Associação das Travestis e Transexuais da Paraíba (Astrapa) is a nonprofit organized civil society entity (Oscip) located in João Pessoa, the capital of the state of Paraíba.

It currently operates out of a restored building in downtown João Pessoa, Paraíba, known as the “Third Sector Cultural Center,” which has been made available to various NGOs. Until February 2020, the organization was chaired by activist Fernanda Benvenutty.
